Stevenson is a surname, and it may also refer to:

In places:
Stevenson, Alabama, USA
Stevenson, Indiana, USA
Stevenson, Maryland, USA
Stevenson, Washington, USA
Stevenson, California, USA

In educational institutions:
Adlai E. Stevenson High School (disambiguation), (various locations)
Stevenson College (Edinburgh)
Stevenson College (University of California, Santa Cruz), residential college at the University of California, Santa Cruz
Stevenson University, in Baltimore County, Maryland
Stevenson School
 upper school campus in Pebble Beach, California, USA
 lower school campus in Carmel, California, USA

In other uses:
Donoghue v. Stevenson, legal case originating in Scotland
Stevenson and Higgins, Scottish cabinet company
Stevenson screen an enclosure for meteorological instruments

See also
 Stephenson (disambiguation)